Lipovača  may refer to:

 Lipovača, Vukovar-Syrmia County, a village near Vukovar, Croatia, population 426
 Lipovača, Karlovac County, a village near Rakovica, Croatia, population 195
 Lipovača, Šipovo, a village near Šipovo, Bosnia and Herzegovina
 Gornja Lipovača, a village near Bosanska Gradiška, Bosnia and Herzegovina

See also
Lipovac (disambiguation)
Lipovica (disambiguation)